The 2019 Zippo 200 at The Glen is a NASCAR Xfinity Series race held on August 3, 2019, at Watkins Glen International in Watkins Glen, New York. Contested over 82 laps on the  road course, it was the 20th race of the 2019 NASCAR Xfinity Series season. Austin Cindric won his first career Xfinity Series race after catching, passing, and holding off experienced Watkins Glen cup winner AJ Allmendinger, who would later be disqualified from the event.

Background

Track

Watkins Glen International (nicknamed "The Glen") is an automobile race track located in Watkins Glen, New York at the southern tip of Seneca Lake. It was long known around the world as the home of the Formula One United States Grand Prix, which it hosted for twenty consecutive years (1961–1980), but the site has been home to road racing of nearly every class, including the World Sportscar Championship, Trans-Am, Can-Am, NASCAR Sprint Cup Series, the International Motor Sports Association and the IndyCar Series.

Entry list

Practice

First practice

Final practice

Qualifying

Qualifying results

Race

Summary
Kyle Busch started on pole. In the first lap, Tyler Reddick slid through the grass and overshot the carousel, forcing him to pit and remove the grass from his grill. Ross Chastain turned Justin Allgaier into the fence after Allgaier drove across the nose of Chastain's car. In the final lap of Stage 1, Allgaier got revenge and slammed Chastain into the tire wall, ending Chastain's day. Busch took the win for stage 1.

Christopher Bell took the lead afterwards, but was passed by Ryan Blaney, who quickly pulled away. Busch caught up to Blaney with 10 laps remaining in the stage and took the lead going into the carousel, but the suspension of Busch's car broke while exiting the carousel and went off-course, ending his day.

A. J. Allmendinger managed to win Stage 2 until he had to pit, giving the lead to Allgaier, who in turn passed it to Austin Cindric until the caution was thrown for debris in the inner loop with 14 laps remaining. In the next restart, Justin Haley, Josh Bilicki and others got together and brought out the final caution. Allmendinger took the lead on the final restart, battling with Cindric via bumps and runs. In the end, Cindric managed to get by Allmendinger and held him off to win the race.

Stage Results

Stage One
Laps: 20

Stage Two
Laps: 20

Final Stage Results

Stage Three
Laps: 42

After the race
A. J. Allmendinger was disqualified (once again) from his runner-up finish after post-race inspection due to the rear of his car being too low. His stage points were also revoked and he was relegated to a 37th place finish. Allmendinger was also disqualified at the July Daytona race a month prior. He stated on Twitter that his car became lower due to contact during an early restart in the race.

References

Zippo 200 at The Glen
Zippo 200 at The Glen
NASCAR races at Watkins Glen International
2019 NASCAR Xfinity Series